The FIFA U-20 Women's World Cup is an international association football tournament, organized by FIFA (Fédération Internationale de Football Association), for national teams of women under the age of 20. The tournament is held in even-numbered years. It was first held in 2002 as the FIFA U-19 Women's World Championship with an upper age limit of 19. In 2006, the age limit was raised to the current 20. The event was renamed as a World Cup since the 2008 competition, making its name consistent with FIFA's other worldwide competitions for national teams.

Starting with the 2010 edition, tournaments held in years immediately preceding the FIFA Women's World Cup are awarded as part of the bidding process for the Women's World Cup. In those years, the U-20 Women's World Cup serves as a test event for the host nation of the Women's World Cup, a role similar to that of the former FIFA Confederations Cup in the men's game.

The current champions are Spain, who won their first title at the 2022 tournament in Costa Rica.

Qualification 
Each continental governing body has its own qualifying tournament, but Africa does not determine a champion.

History

2002
The first women's world championship at the youth level, held as the 2002 FIFA U-19 Women's World Championship, with an age limit of 19, was hosted by Canada. The final, held at Commonwealth Stadium in Edmonton, drew a surprisingly large crowd of 47,000 to watch the hosts play the United States. The US defeated Canada 1–0 on a golden goal by Lindsay Tarpley. Canada's Christine Sinclair was the adidas Golden Ball recipient, as tournament MVP, and the Golden Shoe (10 goals) winner.

2004
The 2004 FIFA U-19 Women's World Championship was held in Thailand. For the second time in a row, the current holders of the adult World Cup, Germany, won the youth competition. The Golden Ball went to Brazilian star, Marta, while for the second time the Golden Boot went to a Canadian, Brittany Timko.

2006
FIFA raised the women's youth championship age limit to 20 to match the men's, beginning with the 2006 FIFA U-20 Women's World Championship, held in Russia from 17 August through 3 September.

The competition was held in four Moscow stadiums (Dinamo, Lokomotiv, Podmoskovie Stadium and Torpedo Stadion) and one in St. Petersburg (Petrovskiy Stadion).

Korea DPR won the final 5–0 over China PR.

2008
The 2008 FIFA U-20 Women's World Championship was held in Chile, from 20 November to 7 December 2008.

Six years after winning their first championship at the youth level in 2002, the United States reclaimed the trophy with a 2–1 win over defending champions Korea DPR. The Golden Ball and the Golden Shoe went to Sydney Leroux of the United States.

2010
The 2010 edition of the tournament was held in Germany from 13 July to 1 August 2010.  The host nation defeated Nigeria in the final to claim its second championship.  It was the first time that an African nation had advanced as far as the semifinals.  It was also the first tournament in which four different confederations were represented in the semifinals.  The Golden Ball and Golden Shoe awards both went to Alexandra Popp of Germany.

2012

The 2012 FIFA U-20 Women's World Cup was played in Japan from 19 August to 8 September, after initially having a hosting bid from Vietnam withdrawn and a bid from Uzbekistan rejected. The Golden Ball award went to Dzsenifer Marozsán of Germany and Golden Shoe award went to Kim Un-hwa of North Korea.

2014
The 2014 FIFA U-20 Women's World Cup was held in Canada from 5–25 August 2014, who reprised its role as host after a Zimbabwean bid withdrew leaving the Canadian bid unopposed. The Golden Ball and Golden Shoe awards both went to Asisat Oshoala of Nigeria.

2016

The 2016 FIFA U-20 Women's World Cup was expected to be held in South Africa, but due to the country's withdrawal, a new host was chosen on 19 March 2015, and it was Papua New Guinea.

2018
The 2018 FIFA U-20 Women's World Cup was held in France from 5–24 August 2018; a year later France would host the 2019 FIFA Women's World Cup. The Golden Ball and Golden Shoe awards both went to Patricia Guijarro of Spain.

2020
The 2020 edition was initially to be hosted jointly by Costa Rica and Panama in August 2020. Due to the COVID-19 pandemic it has been postponed to January 2021, to be solely hosted by Costa Rica. Due to having the highest COVID-19 cases and deaths in the region, Panama withdrew from hosting this event along with the 2022 Central American and Caribbean Games. The tournament was initially postponed to 2021, subject to further monitoring. On 17 November 2020, FIFA announced that the 2020 edition of the tournament would be cancelled.

2022
Following the cancellation of the 2020 edition, Costa Rica were appointed as hosts of the next edition of the tournament in 2022.

2024
As of 2024 the tournament will be expanded from 16 to 24 teams.

Results

Teams reaching the top four

Awards 
 Source: FIFA

Golden Ball
Awarded to the best player of the tournament.

Golden Boot
The topscorer award.

Golden Glove
Awarded to the best goalkeeper.

FIFA Fair Play Trophy

Comprehensive team results in each World Cup 
Legend
 — Champions
 — Runners-up
 — Third place
 — Fourth place
QF – Quarter-finals
GS – Group stage
 — Did not qualify 
 — Did not enter / Withdrew / To be determined
 — Country did not exist or national team was inactive
 — Hosts
Q – Qualified for upcoming tournament

For each tournament, the flag of the host country and the number of teams in each finals tournament (in brackets) are shown.

Results by confederation
 — Hosts are from this confederation

AFC

CAF

CONCACAF

CONMEBOL

OFC

UEFA

See also 
 FIFA Women's World Cup
 FIFA U-17 Women's World Cup
 FIFA U-20 Men's World Cup

References

External links 

  
 Women U-19/U-20 World Cup at the RSSSF

 
Under-20 World Cup
Under-20 association football
Youth football competitions
World youth sports competitions
Recurring sporting events established in 2002
U20, Women's